Dwayne Zinger (born July 5, 1976) is a Canadian former professional ice hockey defenceman who played briefly in the National Hockey League (NHL) with the Washington Capitals.

Playing career
Undrafted, Zinger was signed by the Detroit Red Wings as a free agent in 2000 after graduating from the University of Alaska-Fairbanks.  He played eight seasons in the American Hockey League between 2000 and 2008, and played seven National Hockey League games with the Washington Capitals in 2003–04 NHL season, recording one assist.  He played the 2008–09 season with the Odense Bulldogs of the Danish Elite League. On September 14, 2009, Zinger returned to North America and signed a one-year contract with the Cincinnati Cyclones of the ECHL for the 2009–10 season.

Aftet the conclusion of his playing career, Zinger was named the head coach of the Queen City Storm of the then All American Hockey League on September 27, 2010. Upon the club suspending operations and the League going defunct, Zinger later accepted a position for two seasons as an assistant coach with the Greenville Road Warriors of the ECHL.

Career statistics

References

External links

1976 births
Living people
Alaska Nanooks men's ice hockey players
Canadian ice hockey defencemen
Cincinnati Cyclones (ECHL) players
Cincinnati Mighty Ducks players
Hershey Bears players
Odense Bulldogs players
People from the County of Paintearth No. 18
Portland Pirates players
Providence Bruins players
San Antonio Rampage players
Undrafted National Hockey League players
Washington Capitals players
Canadian expatriate ice hockey players in Denmark